Cydia corollana is a moth belonging to the family Tortricidae. The species was first described by Jacob Hübner in 1822–1823.

References

Grapholitini